= Modern Sanitation =

Modern Sanitation was a British journal published in the 20th century.

It documented developments in sanitation, water infrastructure, and later building developments and maintenance in Britain, with a particular focus on London. By 1946 it was known as Sanitation, drainage and water supply, but by 1967 it was known as Modern Sanitation and Building Maintenance.
